Pachydrus is a genus of beetles in the family Dytiscidae, containing the following species:

 Pachydrus brevis Sharp, 1882
 Pachydrus cayennensis (Laporte, 1835)
 Pachydrus cribratus Sharp, 1882
 Pachydrus globosus (Aubé, 1838)
 Pachydrus obesus Sharp, 1882
 Pachydrus obniger (Chevrolat, 1863)
 Pachydrus politus Sharp, 1882
 Pachydrus princeps (Blatchley, 1914)
 Pachydrus ritsemae Régimbart, 1883

References

Dytiscidae